Summit County is a county located in the U.S. state of Colorado. As of the 2020 census, the population was 31,055. The county seat and largest town is Breckenridge.

Summit County comprises the Breckenridge, CO Micropolitan Statistical Area.

History
Summit County was organized as one of the seventeen original Colorado counties by the First Territorial Legislature on November 1, 1861.  It was named for the many mountain summits in the county.  Until February 2, 1874, its boundaries included the area now comprising Summit County, Grand County, Routt County,  Moffat County, Garfield County, Eagle County, and Rio Blanco County.

In 1874, the northern half of the original Summit County was split off to form Grand County; with the creation of Garfield and Eagle counties in 1883, Summit County arrived at its present boundaries.  In addition, Summit County has seen two major boom eras.

Geography

Much of the county has an Alpine (ET in the Köppen Classification) characterized by tundra vegetation. Breckenridge and other similar elevations in the county have a Subarctic climate (Dfc) characterized by cool summers and abundant snowfall in winter.

Adjacent counties
Grand County – north
Clear Creek County – east
Park County – southeast
Lake County – southwest
Eagle County – west

Major Highways
  Interstate 70

  U.S. Highway 6
  State Highway 9
  State Highway 91

Demographics

As of the census of 2000, there were 23,548 people, 9,120 households, and 4,769 families residing in the county.  The population density was 39 people per square mile (15/km2).  There were 24,201 housing units at an average density of 40 per square mile (15/km2).  The racial makeup of the county was 91.84% White, 0.68% Black or African American, 0.48% Native American, 0.87% Asian, 0.07% Pacific Islander, 3.96% from other races, and 2.10% from two or more races.  9.79% of the population were Hispanic or Latino of any race.

There were 9,120 households, out of which 24.00% had children under the age of 18 living with them, 44.00% were married couples living together, 4.40% had a female householder with no husband present, and 47.70% were non-families. 21.60% of all households were made up of individuals, and 1.60% had someone living alone who was 65 years of age or older.  The average household size was 2.48 and the average family size was 2.86.

In the county, the population was spread out, with 17.40% under the age of 18, 15.70% from 18 to 24, 44.30% from 25 to 44, 19.40% from 45 to 64, and 3.30% who were 65 years of age or older.  The median age was 31 years. As of 2014, the life expectancy in Summit County was 86.83 years, the longest average life expectancy of any county in the United States. For every 100 females there were 139.00 males.  For every 100 females age 18 and over, there were 144.90 males.

The median income for a household in the county was $56,587, and the median income for a family was $66,914 (these figures had risen to $65,281 and $80,441 respectively as of a 2007 estimate). Males had a median income of $33,741 versus $27,017 for females. The per capita income for the county was $28,676.  About 3.10% of families and 9.00% of the population were below the poverty line, including 4.30% of those under age 18 and 3.40% of those age 65 or over.

The 2019 average real estate prices in Summit County were $1,262,929 for a single family home, $559,776 for a condo, townhome or duplex and $344,945 for a vacant piece of land (YTD through December 2019).

Life expectancy

According to a report in the Journal of the American Medical Association, residents of Summit County had a 2014 life expectancy from birth of 86.83 years in 2014, the longest in the United States. Both men and women live longer in Summit County than in any other county in the United States: 85.5 years for men and 88.0 years for women is the life expectancy at birth.  Two contiguous counties, Pitkin and Eagle counties, rank numbers two and three in the nation in life expectancy. Factors contributing to the high life expectancy in Summit County are "high education, high income, high access to medical care, the people are physically active, obesity is lower than anywhere else  — so you’re doing it right.” said Dr. Ali Mokdad, one of the study's co-authors.

Politics
Summit County is liberal in most elections. As of the 2020 presidential election, Summit County has not voted for the Republican candidate since 1988.

Communities

Towns
Blue River
Breckenridge
Dillon
Frisco
Montezuma
Silverthorne

Census-designated places
Copper Mountain
Heeney
Keystone

Ghost towns
Dyersville
Kokomo
Parkville
Preston
Saints John
Tiger

Recreation

National protected areas
White River National Forest
Eagles Nest Wilderness

Ski areas
 Arapahoe Basin
 Breckenridge
 Copper Mountain
 Keystone

Trails and byways
American Discovery Trail
Colorado Trail
Continental Divide National Scenic Trail
Great Parks Bicycle Route
Top of the Rockies National Scenic Byway
TransAmerica Trail Bicycle Route
Vail Pass National Recreation Trail
Wheeler Ten Mile National Recreation Trail

Lakes
The county has two reservoirs, Lake Dillon and Green Mountain Reservoir, that are also popular recreation sites.

Islands
 Silver Dollar Island

See also

Outline of Colorado
Index of Colorado-related articles
National Register of Historic Places listings in Summit County, Colorado
Silverthorne Micropolitan Statistical Area

References

External links

Colorado County Evolution by Don Stanwyck
Colorado Historical Society
Kokomo and Racen ghost towns

 

 
Colorado counties
1861 establishments in Colorado Territory
Populated places established in 1861